The Return of the Condor Heroes is a Taiwanese television series adapted from Louis Cha's novel of the same title. It was first broadcast on TTV in 1998 in Taiwan.

Cast
 Richie Ren as Yang Guo/Yang Kang
 Jacklyn Wu as Xiaolongnü
 Sun Xing as Guo Jing
 Patricia Ha as Huang Rong
 Ji Qin as Guo Fu
 June Tsai as Guo Xiang
 Chen Hong as Li Mochou
 Liu Zi as Lu Wushuang
 Zhu Yan as Cheng Ying
 Heizi as Huodu
 Ben Lee as Yin Zhiping
 Bryan Leung as Hong Qigong
 Li Li-chun as Ouyang Feng
 Yue Yueli as Zhao Zhijing
 Wu Chian-chian as He Yuanjun
 Lee Wai-man as Wanyan Honglie
 Dong Xiaoyan as Gongsun Lü'e
 Jack Kao as Jinlun Fawang
 Norman Chui as Lu Zhanyuan / Gongsun Zhi
 Liu Jia as Mu Nianci

Reception

The series was poorly received in Taiwan and in other countries because Richie Ren and Jackyln Wu were seen to be poor choices as the leads. Some "innovations" were also widely criticised (Wu wears a black cloak instead of ethereal white as in the book). The series has also received negative criticism about not being faithful to the original story.

External links

1998 Taiwanese television series debuts
1998 Taiwanese television series endings
Taiwanese wuxia television series
Television shows based on The Return of the Condor Heroes
Television series set in the Southern Song
Taiwanese romance television series
Television series about orphans